ThermaCare is a brand name of a disposable heating pad made by Angelini. 

The brand was first introduced in 2001 by Procter & Gamble. P&G sold the Thermacare brand to Wyeth in 2008 and merged with Pfizer in 2009. Another merge occurred between Pfizer's and GlaxoSmithKline's consumer healthcare divisions, the brand was sold to the Italian pharmaceutical company Angelini in 2020.

Application

A type of Continuous Low-level Heat-wrap Therapy (CLHT), ThermaCare heat-wraps activate upon contact with air, providing approximately eight hours of heat directly where the heat-wrap is applied. Thermacare heat-wraps are available for specific applications, including neck or wrist pain, low back pain, knee pain and menstrual cramps. Continuous Low-level Heat-wrap Therapy (CLHT) has been shown to provide better results than cold therapy in the early treatment and prevention of Delayed Onset Muscle Soreness (DOMS) - muscle soreness that occurs within 1 to 2 days of physical exertion.

In a low back pain study conducted at the U.S. Spine & Sport Foundation in San Diego, California in 2006, participants treated with Continuous Low-level Heat-wrap Therapy (CLHT) prior to exercise reported less intense pain and less trouble moving after 24 hours than the control group. Study participants treated with the heat-wraps also showed greater (138%) pain relief than those who received standard cold pack treatment, according to the study's research director, John Mayer, Ph.D. The study concluded that heat-wraps were effective in the early treatment and prevention of Delayed Onset Muscle Soreness (DOMS) - soreness that occurs within 1-2 days of physical exertion.

Thermacare heat-wraps have been studied in 13 randomized controlled clinical trials for muscle pain relief efficacy.

Mechanism 
The heat is generated from a chemical reaction, iron oxidation, when the pads are unsealed and exposed oxygen in the air. Iron oxidation is also involved in the rusting of metal, and the transportation of oxygen in blood.  The pads' ingredients include activated carbon, iron powder, sodium chloride, sodium thiosulfate, sodium polyacrylate and water, according to the Themacare FAQ

A portable heat wrap for treatment of back pain was developed in 1997, that didn't use counter-irritants such as menthol or capsaicin (The ThermaCare® HeatWrap™; Procter
and Gamble, Cincinnati, OH). This heat product is a cloth wrap that houses several small disks made of iron powder, activated charcoal, sodium chloride, and water. When the wrap is removed from its sealed pouch and exposed to oxygen, the disks oxidize, producing an exothermic reaction. When this product was applied to the low back muscles, it provided greater pain relief for 24 hours after application when compared to ibuprofen, acetaminophen, and no treatment. When the same product was applied to the wrist, it decreased pain and improved range of motion (ROM) in patients experiencing wrist pain.

Scientists have tested the ability of these topical wraps to increase paraspinal muscle temperatures. The average temperature increase was 2.2°C, at 1.5cm depth and 1.1°C at 2cm. This is similar to silicate-gel hot packs, except hot packs start to lose heat at 15–20 minutes, whereas the portable heat wraps maintained their heat for the entire 90 minute application.

Reviews
In a 2004 Journal of Orthopaedic & Sports Physical Therapy study, ThermaCare HeatWrap is compared with the Johnson & Johnson Back Plaster, and the ABC
Warme-Pflaster. 
In 2008, the Medical Science Monitor also published a research paper on the ThermaCare heat wrap. 
In 2016 a longitudinal crossover study involving ThermaCare HeatWraps was published in the Journal of Chiropractic Medicine.

See also
 Delayed onset muscle soreness (DOMS)

References

External links
 Official website
 Official website United Kingdom (UK)
 Official website Republic of Ireland

Pfizer brands